Glory of Heroes by Wanmingyang Media is a kickboxing promotion, The first event in 2018 was on January 6, 2018 at the Wudang International Wushu Exchange Center in Hubei, China.

List of events

Glory of Heroes 36: Ziyang

Glory of Heroes 36: Ziyang was a kickboxing and MMA event held on October 20, 2018 at the Ziyang Gymnasium in Sichuan, China.

Results

Glory of Heroes 35: Meishan

Glory of Heroes 35: Meishan was a kickboxing and MMA event held on October 12, 2018 at the Meishan Gymnasium in Sichuan, China.

Results

Glory of Heroes 34: Tongling

Glory of Heroes 34: Tongling was a kickboxing and MMA event held on September 15, 2018 at the Tongling Sports Center in Anhui, China.

Results

Glory of Heroes 33: Shanghai

Glory of Heroes 33: Shanghai was a kickboxing and MMA event held on July 28, 2018 at the Shanghai Baoshan Gymnasium in Shanghai, China.

Results

Glory of Heroes 32: Huizhou

Glory of Heroes 32: Huizhou was a kickboxing and MMA event held on July 7, 2018 at the Huiyang Sports Exhibition Center in Guangdong, China.

Results

Glory of Heroes 31: Beijing

Glory of Heroes 31: Beijing was a kickboxing and MMA event held on May 26, 2018 at the Beijing Police Academy in Beijing, China.

Results

Glory of Heroes: New Zealand vs China

Glory of Heroes: New Zealand vs China was a kickboxing and MMA event held on March 3, 2018 at the ASB Stadium in Auckland, New Zealand.

Results

Glory of Heroes: Chengdu

Glory of Heroes: Chengdu was a kickboxing event held on February 3, 2018 at the Sichuan International Tennis Center in Chengdu, China.

Results

Glory of Heroes: Qingdao

Glory of Heroes: Qingdao was a kickboxing and MMA event held on January 27, 2018 at the China University of Petroleum Huadong Gymnasium in Qingdao, China.

Results

Glory of Heroes: Guangzhou

Glory of Heroes: Guangzhou was a kickboxing and MMA event held on January 13, 2018 at the Guangzhou University Town Sports Cent in Guangzhou, China.

Results

Glory of Heroes: Wudang Mountain

Glory of Heroes: Wudang Mountain was a kickboxing and MMA event held on January 6, 2018 at the Wudang International Wushu Exchange Center in Hubei, China.

Results

See also
2018 in Glory
2018 in Kunlun Fight
2018 in K-1  
2018 in ONE Championship
2018 in Romanian kickboxing

References

2018 in kickboxing
Kickboxing in China